Elspeth Ballantyne (born c. 1940) is an Australian retired actress, who appeared in productions in theatre, television and films over a career that spanned nearly 60 years, a veteran of the industry having started her career as a child actor and becoming a staple of the theatre starting from in 1947, in a production of Macbeth and by the age of 14 in 1954 had turned pro., performing in stage roles for the next 37 years, including a stage play tour of the United Kingdom of her iconic "Prisoner" role including at the Alexandra Theatre in Birmingham

Ballantyne is probably best known for her small screen roles in numerous TV serials. Her first major TV role was in the serial Bellbird in 1967 as librarian Laura "Lori" Chandler (formerly Grey), opposite actor Dennis Miller, whom she would marry the following year, she remained in the role until 1971.

She became a staple of the early Crawford Production serials in the 1970s, however became best known for her role in the TV cult series Prisoner (known internationally as Prisoner: Cell Block H) from 1979 to 1986 as original character of firm but fair Prison Officer Meg Jackson (later Morris). She was the only actress to appear in the series' full 8-season run. 
 
After Prisoner she took guest roles in The Flying Doctors and G.P., before becoming a regular starring in the soap opera Neighbours as coffee shop owner Cathy Alessi, the wife of Benito Alessi (George Spartels) and the mother of Rick and Marco Alessi Dan Falzon and Felice Arena, as part of a new Italian family that was introduced to the series in 1992. She left the show the following year.

Subsequently, she appeared in guest parts on TV dramas Blue Heelers, The Secret Life of Us' and All Saints and miniseries Paper Giants: Magazine Wars (2013)

She has featured in film roles (with features and telemovies) including The Caterpillar Wish (2006), Moonlight and Magic (2007), Red Hill (2010),  Boronia Boys (2009) and sequel Boronia Backpackers  (2011)

Biography
Early career

Ballantyne was born into a show business family in Adelaide, South Australia, the daughter of Gwenneth Ballantyne, an actress and teacher and Colin George Sandergrove Ballantyne a photographer, who became a prominent figure in theatre as an actor, producer and director and arts administrator who was head of the South Australian Theatre Company, the predecessor as the State Theatre Company. Ballantyne has a brother Guy Ballantyne who is an actor and sister Jane Ballantyne a film producer.

Having started her career as a laboratory technician at the Royal Adelaide Hospital, she decided upon an acting career and attended drama school, at NIDA

TV series roles
Bellbird, Prisoner and Neighbours

Ballantyne appeared in three iconic small screen roles, starting with the serial Bellbird broadcast by the ABC as librarian Lori Chandler and subsequently moved to commercial TV playing firm but compassionate prison officer Meg Jackson Morris in the soap opera Prisoner. Ballantyne was the only actor to stay with the series for its entire eight-year run. She later reprised her famous role of Meg in the original stage tour of Prisoner: Cell Block H – The Stage Play, which toured the UK in 1989.

In the early 1990s, she had a stint in Channel Ten soap opera Neighbours, as part of the Italian Alessi family.

Film roles

She has appeared in feature films The Caterpillar Wish as Mrs. Woodbridge, and in Moonlight & Magic as thrift shop owner Desma. Ballantyne also appeared in the drama short film Twenty Five Cents (2007), and as the wheelchair-bound matriarch in the short The Last Tupper (2011). She played Maxine Danials in the Boronia movies Boronia Boys (2009) and Boronia Backpackers (2011) and Paper Giants: Magazine Wars in 2013.

Personal life

Ballantyne was married to actor Dennis Miller from 1968 to 1977. Both had leading roles in the long-running series Bellbird''. They have two sons together: Matthew and Tobias. She is the sister of film producer Jane Ballantyne.

Filmography 

FILM

TELEVISION

References

External links

1939 births
Living people
Actresses from Adelaide
National Institute of Dramatic Art alumni
Australian film actresses
Australian soap opera actresses
20th-century Australian actresses
21st-century Australian actresses